Factory Farming Awareness Coalition (FFAC) is a nonprofit organization founded in 2014 by Katie Cantrell in the San Francisco Bay Area.

FFAC currently operates in ten different regions across the United States.

History 
In 2010, Katie Cantrell, then a student at the University of California, Berkeley, (UCB) developed a presentation on the impacts of factory farming. She began giving the presentation at local colleges and K-12 schools around the San Francisco Bay Area.

In 2012, FFAC received the second most votes in a Facebook poll sponsored by BART's sustainability-focused Blue Sky Program. As a result, FFAC was awarded a month's worth of advertising on BART trains and stations. The ads encouraged BART riders to adopt Meatless Mondays citing the environmental benefits of doing so.

In 2018, FFAC piloted its first intern program, training students to give humane education presentations, campaign for plant-based options in their cafeterias, and work in other areas of outreach.

Current Programs 
FFAC's current programming consists of educational outreach, a semester-long Student Advocates program, and auxiliary programs.

The educational outreach consists of customizable programming on the impacts of factory farming for students from K-12 and above, as well as environmental organizations, faith- and values-based communities, businesses, and government agencies.

The auxiliary programs include community and educational webinars, a book group, and veg support to help people transition to a plant-based lifestyle.

References

External links 
 

Humane education